The Saramaguacán Formation is a geologic formation in Cuba. It preserves mainly plant fossils, dating back to the Middle Eocene period.

See also 

 List of fossiliferous stratigraphic units in Cuba

References

Further reading 
 
 A. Graham, D. Cozadd, A. Areces Mallea and N. O. Frederiksen. 2000. Studies in neotropical paleobotany. XIV. A palynoflora from the Middle Eocene Saramaguacan Formation of Cuba. American Journal of Botany 87(10):1526-1539

Geologic formations of Cuba
Paleogene Cuba
Paleontology in Cuba
Formations